Colin Fyfe Miller (born 4 October 1964) is a Canadian professional soccer coach who captained the Canadian national team several times while earning 61 caps (scoring 5 goals) in total.

Club career
Moving to Vancouver at the age of 10, Miller began his professional playing career as a 17-year-old, joining the Toronto Blizzard of the NASL in 1982. After playing 23 games over three seasons with the Blizzard, Miller joined Scottish giants Rangers, where he spent the 1984–85 and 1985–86 seasons, appearing in four first-team games.

Miller played in 61 games and scored three goals for Football League side Doncaster Rovers in 1986–87 and 1987–88, for Scottish Football League club Hamilton Academical 199 times over six seasons (1989–94), St Johnstone in 12 games in 1994, Heart of Midlothian 16 games in 1994–95, Dunfermline 62 times over three seasons (1995–98), Ayr United six times in 1998, and eight times as a player-manager of Academical in 1998–99.  Miller also played two summer seasons for the Hamilton Steelers in the Canadian Soccer League, playing 27 times in 1988 and 11 times in 1990.

International career
Miller made his national team debut against Scotland on 19 June 1983 and was a squad member for Canada's only World Cup finals appearance in 1986 although he did not play. He has represented Canada in 26 FIFA World Cup qualification matches. His final international was a November 1997 World Cup qualification match against Costa Rica, a game in which seven other national team veterans finished their international career.

Managerial career
He became Canada's assistant coach in the early 2000s and interim manager in 2003–04. Miller was a youth soccer coach with the Abbotsford Soccer Association in the Fraser Valley in British Columbia, specifically the Abbotsford Rangers USL Premier Development League side, until 2007.

On 3 July 2007, it was announced that Colin Miller was hired as assistant first-team coach of Derby County, an English club playing the 2007-08 season in the Premier League.

On 2 April 2008, Miller was introduced as the manager and Director of Soccer Operations for the Victoria Highlanders FC of the USL Premier Development League.

On 25 March 2010, with the resignation of German soccer coach Thomas Niendorf, Miller was named as the new manager of the Vancouver Whitecaps Residency. Miller served as Assistant Manager of Vancouver Whitecaps FC during the club's 2011 inaugural season in Major League Soccer. Vancouver released Miller from his coaching contract on 26 October 2011, due to the newly appointed manager Martin Rennie's desire to bring in his own staff.

On 27 November 2012, FC Edmonton announced Colin Miller as its new manager.

In January 2013, Miller was confirmed interim manager of Canada for a second time following the departure of Stephen Hart. On 14 March 2013, it was announced that Tony Fonseca, technical director for the Canadian Soccer Association, as manager of the Canadian national team for the friendly matches in March 2013, although Miller returned as interim head coach for a match in Edmonton on 28 May. The CSA announced in mid-June that Miller would continue as interim manager for Canada during the 2013 CONCACAF Gold Cup.

On 4 December 2017, FC Edmonton parted ways with Miller after five seasons following the dissolution of the North American Soccer League.

Career statistics

International

International goals
Scores and results list Canada's goal tally first.

Managerial record

Personal life

Colin Miller is married to his high school sweet heart Maria Miller.

References

External links
 / Canada Soccer Hall of Fame

1964 births
Living people
Scottish emigrants to Canada
Naturalized citizens of Canada
Footballers from Hamilton, South Lanarkshire
Soccer players from Vancouver
Canadian soccer players
Association football defenders
Toronto Blizzard (1971–1984) players
Rangers F.C. players
Doncaster Rovers F.C. players
Hamilton Steelers (1981–1992) players
Hamilton Academical F.C. players
St Johnstone F.C. players
Heart of Midlothian F.C. players
Dunfermline Athletic F.C. players
Ayr United F.C. players
Fraser Valley Mariners players
North American Soccer League (1968–1984) players
Scottish Football League players
English Football League players
Canadian Soccer League (1987–1992) players
USL League Two players
Canada men's youth international soccer players
Canada men's international soccer players
1986 FIFA World Cup players
1991 CONCACAF Gold Cup players
1993 CONCACAF Gold Cup players
1996 CONCACAF Gold Cup players
Canada Soccer Hall of Fame inductees
Canadian expatriate soccer players
Canadian expatriate sportspeople in Scotland
Canadian expatriate sportspeople in England
Expatriate footballers in Scotland
Expatriate footballers in England
Association football player-managers
Canadian soccer coaches
Hamilton Academical F.C. managers
Canada men's national soccer team managers
Derby County F.C. non-playing staff
Vancouver Whitecaps FC non-playing staff
FC Edmonton coaches
Scottish Football League managers
USL League Two coaches
North American Soccer League coaches
Canadian expatriate soccer coaches
Expatriate football managers in Scotland